Daria Vadimovna Dubova (born January 29, 1999, in Voronezh, Russia) is a Russian Group rhythmic gymnast. She is the 2014 Youth Olympic Group all-around champion and the 2013 European Junior Group all-around champion.

Gymnastics career 
A former individual gymnast, Dubova has competed at the 2013 Russian Junior Championships finishing 13th in the all-around, she was coached by Anna Shumilova. Dubova later began competing in group and was a member of Russian Group that competed at the  2013 European Junior Championships with Russia taking the gold medal scoring a total of (33.916) ahead of Belarus (32.700) and Bulgaria (32.532) in the all-around competition. They won another gold medal in 5 hoops final.

In 2014, Dubova was recovering from injury at the start of the season. On August 26–27, Dubova replaced Karina Katyuhina who broke her leg a week before start of the competition. Dubova rejoined the Russian Group (with Daria Anenkova, Victoria Ilina, Sofya Skomorokh, Natalia Safonova) that competed at the 2014 Youth Olympic Games in Nanjing, China where they won gold in Group All-around finals.

In 2015, Dubova was added to Russia's National Reserve Team as a senior gymnast.

In 2018, she switched from rhythmic gymnastics to aesthetic group gymnastics and started competing for Russian team Expressia.

References

External links 

 
 2014 YOG Profile
 
 

1999 births
Living people
Russian rhythmic gymnasts
Sportspeople from Voronezh
Gymnasts at the 2014 Summer Youth Olympics
Youth Olympic gold medalists for Russia
21st-century Russian women